United States presidential elections in Washington may refer to:

 United States presidential elections in Washington (state)
 United States presidential elections in Washington, D.C.